The women's 5000 metres at the 2019 Asian Athletics Championships was held on 21 April.

Results

References
Results

5000
5000 metres at the Asian Athletics Championships
2019 in women's athletics